Just a Matter of Duty is a 1993 German drama film directed by Thomas Mitscherlich, about a German war crimes trial following World War II. It was entered into the 43rd Berlin International Film Festival.

Cast
In alphabetical order
 Marquard Bohm as Jean Blome / Hans Blome
 Traugott Buhre as Direktor der Dresdner Bank
 Andreina de Martin as Lisbeth Schwaerzel
  as Elisabeth Bethke
 Christoph Eichhorn as Photographer
 Peter Fitz as Anwalt
 Burghart Klaußner as Werner Kraengel
 Richy Müller as Walter Bethke
 Karin Nennemann
 Dieter Schaad as Carl Friedrich Goerdeler
 Doris Schade as Psychiaterin
 Tana Schanzara as Mutter Schwärzel
 Elisabeth Schwarz as Anneliese Goerdeler
 Katharina Thalbach as Helene Schwaerzel
 Markus Voellenklee
 Karl-Heinz von Hassel as Direktor der Deutschen Bank
 Hanns Zischler as Investigator

References

External links

1993 films
1993 drama films
1990s German-language films
German drama films
Films directed by Thomas Mitscherlich
Films set in the 1940s
Films about Nazi Germany
1990s German films